Villa Pallavicini is the name of several Italian villas and palazzi, including:

 Palazzo Pallavicini-Rospigliosi, Rome
 Villa Durazzo-Pallavicini, outside Genoa
 Villa Gandolfi Pallavicini, Bologna